Charged multivesicular body protein 4b is a protein that in humans is encoded by the CHMP4B gene.

References

External links

Further reading